Chit Thu Htwin Tae Atkhayar is a 2017 Burmese drama television series. It aired on MRTV-4, from March 27 to June 5, 2017, on Mondays to Fridays at 19:15 for 50 episodes.

Cast
Kyaw Hsu as Nanda
Wint Yamone Naing as May Htake Htar San
Kyaw Htet as Thuria
Han Na Lar as Shwe Yi
Min Khant Ko as Sit Paing
Wai Yan Kyaw as Zaw Gyi
Ju Jue Pan Htwar as Nan Mo
Phoe Kyaw as U San Shwe
La Pyae as Htun Hla

References

Burmese television series
MRTV (TV network) original programming